Jordi Portabella (Barcelona, 1961) was a member of the Catalan Parliament (1992-1999) and president of ERC in the City Hall of Barcelona (1999-2015), Nowadays is the CEO of Catalan Foundation of Research and Innovation.

References

External links 
Personal website

1961 births
Living people
Politicians from Barcelona
Republican Left of Catalonia politicians
Polytechnic University of Catalonia alumni